Puerto Caimito is a town and corregimiento in La Chorrera District, Panamá Oeste Province, Panama with a population of 16,951 as of 2010. Its population as of 1990 was 3,623; its population as of 2000 was 7,198.  It was the boyhood home of New York Yankees relief pitcher Mariano Rivera.

References

Corregimientos of Panamá Oeste Province
Populated places in Panamá Province